The Metro Transportes Sul do Tejo (MTS, South Tagus Rapid Transit System) is a light rail system that provides the Almada and Seixal municipalities, Portugal with mass-transit services.

The MTS connects to Fertagus commuter rail trains to Lisbon and Setúbal at Pragal and Corroios stations.

Lines
MTS has three lines:
 Line 1: Cacilhas — Corroios
 Line 2: Corroios — Pragal
 Line 3: Cacilhas — Universidade
 It began circulating in May 2007 from Corroios to Cova da Piedade.
 It was expanded from Cova da Piedade to Universidade(FCT) in November 2007.
 The first stage was completed in December 2008, when Cacilhas started working.

The rolling stock consists of 24 trams from Siemens (model Combino Plus).

External links
 

Rapid transit in Portugal
750 V DC railway electrification